Andrés Felipe Serna Martínez (born 15 November 1997) is a Colombian weightlifter. He won the gold medal in the men's 96kg event at the 2022 Pan American Weightlifting Championships held in Bogotá, Colombia. He is also a two-time gold medalist at the 2022 Bolivarian Games held in Valledupar, Colombia.

In 2017, he competed in the men's 94kg event at the World Weightlifting Championships held in Anaheim, California, United States. He also competed in the men's 96kg event at the 2021 World Weightlifting Championships held in Tashkent, Uzbekistan. He competed in the men's 109kg event at the 2022 South American Games held in Asunción, Paraguay.

Achievements

References

External links 
 

Living people
1997 births
Colombian male weightlifters
Pan American Weightlifting Championships medalists
Competitors at the 2022 South American Games
South American Games competitors for Colombia
21st-century Colombian people